was a Japanese three-member R&B group which formed in 1996. They soon made their debut in January 1997 on the Flava Records label. The members featured DJ Hasebe (programming), Aiko Machida (vocals) and Kawabe (composer). The band achieved success with the single "Garden" in 1999, which featured Kenji Furuya of Dragon Ash. The band was seen as one of the prominent new R&B-style musicians in Japan in the late 1990s.

In 2001, the band went on a permanent hiatus after the release of the single "Soulmate." Vocalist Aiko went on to become the vocalist of drum and bass band Kam in 2010. 

Kumi Koda covered the Sugar Soul song "Ima Sugu Hoshii" in 2006, and in 2009 May J. covered "Garden."

Discography

Original albums

Other albums

Singles

References

External links 
 Web archive of official site 
 Warner Music Japan label site 

Japanese hip hop groups
Musical groups established in 1996
Musical groups disestablished in 2001
Contemporary R&B musical groups
1996 establishments in Japan
2001 disestablishments in Japan